Edward J. Amann Jr. (July 17, 1925 – July 15, 2009) was an American politician who served in the New York State Assembly from 1953 to 1973.

He died on July 15, 2009, in Staten Island, New York City, New York at age 83.

References

1925 births
2009 deaths
Republican Party members of the New York State Assembly
20th-century American politicians